Maika Angela Ortiz (born August 30, 1991) is a Filipino volleyball athlete player of the Foton Tornadoes volleyball team in the PSL. She is currently a member of the Philippines women's national volleyball team.

Career
Ortiz played for the UST Golden Tigresses on her college years. She won the Best Attacker award in the UAAP Season 74 volleyball tournaments. She played for the Philippine Air Force Volleyball Team in the Shakey's V-League. She also played for the Chery Tiggo Crossovers in the Philippine Super Liga and Premier Volleyball League.

Awards

Individual
 UAAP Season 74 "Best Attacker"
 Shakey's V-League 10th Season First Conference "Best Blocker"
 Shakey's V-League 11th Season Open Conference "Best Blocker" 2016 PSL Grand Prix Conference "2nd Best Middle Blocker" 2021 PNVF Champions League for Women "2nd Best Middle Blocker"''

Team
 2014 POC-PSC Philippine National Games Women's Volleyball –  Champions, with Philippine Air Force Lady Jet Spikers
 2016 PSL All-Filipino Conference –  Silver medal, with Foton Tornadoes
 2016 PSL Grand Prix Conference –  Champions, with Foton Tornadoes
 2017 PSL Invitational Cup –  Bronze medal, with Foton Tornadoes
 2017 PSL Grand Prix Conference –  Bronze medal, with Foton Tornadoes
 2018 PSL Grand Prix Conference –  Bronze medal, with Foton Tornadoes
 2021 PVL Open Conference –  Champions, with Chery Tiggo Crossovers
 2021 PNVF Champions League for Women -  Silver medal, with Chery Tiggo Crossovers

References

Living people
Filipino women's volleyball players
1991 births
University Athletic Association of the Philippines volleyball players
University of Santo Tomas alumni
Middle blockers
Philippines women's international volleyball players
Competitors at the 2017 Southeast Asian Games
Volleyball players at the 2018 Asian Games
Asian Games competitors for the Philippines
LGBT volleyball players
Filipino LGBT sportspeople
Southeast Asian Games competitors for the Philippines